The 1951 All-Big Ten Conference football team consists of American football players selected to the All-Big Ten Conference teams selected by the Associated Press (AP), United Press (UP) and the International News Service (INS) for the 1951 Big Ten Conference football season.

Offensive selections

Quarterbacks
 John Coatta, Wisconsin (AP-1; UP-1)

Halfbacks
 Johnny Karras, Illinois (AP-1; UP-1)
 Paul Giel, Minnesota (AP-1; UP-2)
 Vic Janowicz, Ohio State (UP-1)

Fullbacks
 Bill Reichardt, Iowa (AP-1; UP-1)

Ends
 Lowell Perry, Michigan (AP-1; UP-1)
 Rex Smith, Illinois (AP-1)
 Leo Sugar, Purdue (UP-1)
 Faverty, Wisconsin (UP-2)
 Gandee, Ohio State (UP-2)

Tackles
 Tom Johnson, Michigan (AP-1; UP-1)
 Chuck Ulrich, Illinois (AP-1; UP-1)

Guards
 Don MacRae, Northwestern (AP-1; UP-1)
 Chuck Studley, Illinois (AP-1; UP-1)
 Skibinsk, Purdue (UP-2)

Centers
 Wayne Robinson, Minnesota (AP-1; UP-2)
 Boerio, Illinois (UP-1)

Defensive selections

Ends
Pat O'Donahue, Wisconsin (AP-1)
Leo Sugar, Purdue (AP-1)

Tackles
Dick Logan, Ohio State (AP-1; UP-2)
Jerry Smith, Wisconsin (AP-1; UP-2)

Guards
Robert Kennedy, Wisconsin (AP-1; UP-2)
Deral Teteak, Wisconsin (AP-1)

Linebackers
Charles Boerlo, Illinois (AP-1)
Roger Zatkoff, Michigan (AP-1; UP-3)

Backs
Vic Janowicz, Ohio State (AP-1)
Al Brosky, Illinois (AP-1)
Fred Bruney, Ohio State (AP-1)

Key

See also
1951 College Football All-America Team

References

All-Big Ten Conference
All-Big Ten Conference football teams